Chalas is a surname.

List of people with the surname 

 Émilie Chalas (born 1977), French politician
 Fany Chalas (born 1993), Dominican sprinter
 Juan Chalas (born 1956), Dominican judoka
 Tomasz Chałas (born 1988), Polish retired footballer

See also 

 Chala (name)

Surnames